Pseudostachyum polymorphum is a monotypic Asian species of bamboo in the grass family.

It is the only known species of the genus Pseudostachyum. The plant is found in Assam, Arunachal Pradesh, Bhutan, Myanmar, Vietnam, Thailand, and southern China (Yunnan, Guangdong, Guangxi).

Formerly included
see Melocalamus Neohouzeaua
Pseudostachyum compactiflorum - Melocalamus compactiflorus
Pseudostachyum glomeriflorum - Melocalamus compactiflorus
Pseudostachyum helferi - Neohouzeaua helferi

References

Bambusoideae
Flora of Asia
Bambusoideae genera
Monotypic Poaceae genera